Ruesha Littlejohn (born 3 July 1990) is an Irish footballer who plays as a striker for FAWSL side Aston Villa. She has also had four spells with Glasgow City and stints with Norwegian First Division club IL Sandviken and English sides Arsenal, Liverpool, London Bees, Leicester City and Birmingham City. Despite having played youth football for Scotland, Littlejohn chose to feature at the senior level for the Republic of Ireland.

Club career
Glasgow-born Littlejohn played youth football with Clydebank and Baillieston girls before joining Arsenal North. She signed for Glasgow City in January 2007 and won four successive titles with the club. In January 2010 Littlejohn signed for English champions Arsenal and made an immediate debut in the Gunners' 2–1 home win over Chelsea. Shortly afterwards Tony Gervaise, who had also been Littlejohn's coach in Scotland's youth national teams, stood down as Arsenal manager. With Littlejohn then out of favour she returned to Scotland on loan with Rangers, where she featured in the first women's match to be staged at Ibrox Stadium.

Littlejohn then returned to Glasgow City. She hit seven goals in the final game of the season against Inverness, as City secured another Premier League title.

Along with Megan Sneddon and Suzanne Lappin, Littlejohn signed for Liverpool Ladies ahead of the 2011 FA WSL season. The Scottish trio made their Liverpool bow in a friendly win over Hibernian Ladies. On her competitive debut against Charlton Athletic in the FA Women's Cup, Littlejohn marked the occasion by scoring a hat-trick. She also fired a last-minute goal as Liverpool held rivals Everton 3–3 in the opening match of the WSL campaign. During the mid-season break Littlejohn and Lappin went back to Scotland, this time with Celtic, making their debuts against Rangers.

In May 2012, the Football Association (FA) gave Littlejohn a six-match ban and charged her £500 costs for comments made on Twitter. During the 2012 FA WSL mid-season break, Littlejohn returned to Glasgow City: "It is great to be back at City again. I know the club so well. I have been here since I turned 16 years old and City is like my home, as I always seem to come back here."

In March 2014 Littlejohn signed for the Norwegian First club IL Sandviken, based in Bergen. By August she had scored 11 goals in 13 games to top the goalscorer's chart. She finished the season as the league's top goalscorer with 19 goals from 22 matches as Sandviken were promoted to the Toppserien as 1. divisjon champions.

Littlejohn was called into the Ireland squad in February 2015, listed as a free agent. After a year with Celtic in 2015, Littlejohn returned to Glasgow City for her fourth spell with the club in January 2016. She departed during the mid-season break, and was back in Celtic colours for the second part of the campaign.

In July 2018 Littlejohn signed with London Bees. In 2019, she joined West Ham United on non-contract terms. On 25 January 2020, she signed a deal until the end of the season.

On 16 January 2021 it was announced the Littlejohn had signed for Birmingham City for the remainder of the 2020/21 season. She made her debut the next day in a 0-0 drawn with Brighton.

On 1 September 2021 it was announced that Littlejohn had signed for Aston Villa for the 2021-22 season.

International career

Scotland 
Littlejohn represented Scotland at Under-15 and Under-17 level. At the Under-19 age group, Littlejohn was part of the side which qualified for the 2008 UEFA Women's Under-19 Championship in France. She scored Scotland's only goal in a 3–1 defeat to England at the final tournament group stage. Littlejohn scored 12 goals in her 15 appearances for Scotland's Under-19s.

Scotland's senior national team coach Anna Signeul excluded Littlejohn due to personal differences: "Em, well, the senior manager wasn’t a fan of mine. I think she thought I had too much carry on, a little personality, and she wasn’t really into that."

Ireland 
After three years of not playing internationally, Littlejohn's situation caught the eye of Arsenal teammates Emma Byrne, Yvonne Tracy and Niamh Fahey. They alerted the FAI to her eligibility through her maternal grandparents.

In February 2012 Littlejohn received her first call–up to the senior Republic of Ireland squad, for the 2012 Algarve Cup. She made her debut with the Irish national team against Hungary at the final game of the Algarve Cup on 7 March 2012. Ireland won 2–1 to avoid a last place finish. Altogether Littlejohn has so far been capped over 60 times by the Irish.

International goals
Scores and results list Ireland's goal tally first.

Personal life
Ruesha's twin sister Shebahn was a travel reporter on Glasgow radio station 102.5 Clyde 1. The family has a Northern Irish background and grew up in Old Drumchapel. She is openly lesbian. In June 2019, fellow player and captain Katie McCabe revealed that they are in a relationship and that women's association football is very accepting of LGBT people.

Honours

Club
Glasgow City
Scottish FA Cup: 2009, 2012 & 2013
Scottish Women's Premier League Cup: 2009 & 2013

IL Sandviken
1. divisjon: 2014

Individual
Glasgow City Top Goalscorer: 2009
1. divisjon topscorer: 2014

See also
List of sportspeople who competed for more than one nation

References

External links

Ruesha Littlejohn at Glasgow City FC
Ruesha Littlejohn at Liverpool LFC
Ruesha Littlejohn at Celtic FC
Ruesha Littlejohn at the Football Association of Ireland (FAI)

1990 births
Living people
Celtic F.C. Women players
Arsenal W.F.C. players
Liverpool F.C. Women players
Glasgow City F.C. players
FA Women's National League players
Women's Super League players
Republic of Ireland women's association footballers
Republic of Ireland women's international footballers
Women's association football forwards
Footballers from Glasgow
SK Brann Kvinner players
Republic of Ireland expatriate association footballers
Expatriate women's footballers in Norway
Irish expatriate sportspeople in Norway
Scottish Women's Premier League players
LGBT association football players
Scottish LGBT sportspeople
Lesbian sportswomen
London Bees players
West Ham United F.C. Women players
Rangers W.F.C. players
Birmingham City W.F.C. players
Aston Villa W.F.C. players
Scottish women's footballers
Scottish people of Northern Ireland descent
Scottish twins
Twin sportspeople